Dhankhar may refer to:

 Dhankar Gompa, a monastery in Spiti, India
 Dhankar Lake, a lake in Spiti Valley, Himachal Pradesh, India
 Dhankar Village, in Himachal Pradesh, India

See also
 Dhankhar, a Jaat surname